Anthia calva is a species of ground beetle in the subfamily Anthiinae. It was described by Sternberg in 1907.

References

Anthiinae (beetle)
Beetles described in 1907